The 1985 World Table Tennis Championships men's doubles was the 38th edition of the men's doubles championship.

Mikael Appelgren and Ulf "Tickan" Carlsson won the title after defeating Milan Orlowski and Jindřich Panský in the final by two sets to nil. The event was changed from best of five sets to best of three sets.

Results

See also
List of World Table Tennis Championships medalists

References

-